Chilham Castle is a Jacobean manor house and keep in the village of Chilham, between Ashford and Canterbury in the county of Kent, England. The keep is of Norman origin and dates to 1174; the manor house was completed in 1616 for Sir Dudley Digges.

Current Owners: Tish Aletheia

History
The polygonal keep of the Norman Castle, the oldest building in the village, dates from 1174 and is still inhabited - making it perhaps one of the oldest dwellings in the UK. It was said to have been built for King Henry II. But archaeological excavations carried out in the 1920s suggest that it stands on the foundations of a much older Anglo-Saxon fortification, possibly dating from the seventh century. In June 1320, Chilham Castle was the venue for a splendid reception hosted by Bartholomew de Badlesmere for Edward II and his entourage when they were travelling to Dover en route for France.

The Jacobean building, within sight of the "Old Castle" (the keep), was completed in 1616 for Sir Dudley Digges on a hexagonal plan, with five angled ranges and the sixth left open. It has battlemented parapets, clustered facetted columnar brick chimneys and corner towers with squared ogee cappings.

The Victorian tradition that this bold but vernacular house was designed by Inigo Jones is not credited by architectural historians. Indeed, Nicholas Stone, a master mason who had worked under Jones' direction at Holyrood Palace in 1616, and at the Whitehall Banqueting House, was commissioned to add a funerary chapel to Chilham church for Sir Dudley Digges, to contain Stone's funerary monument to Lady Digges, in 1631–32; if any traces of the manner of Jones were discernible at Chilham Castle, Nicholas Stone might be considered as a candidate. It is, nevertheless, one of the finer mansions in the south-east of England and commands exceptional views across the valley of the River Stour, Kent.

The gardens, said originally to have been laid out by John Tradescant the elder, were redesigned twice in the eighteenth century. First, under the London banker James Colebrooke (who bought the estate from the Digges family) fine vistas were created stretching to the river and then, under Thomas Heron (who acquired the estate from Colebrooke's son Robert),<ref>Robert's domed mausoleum, designed by Sir Robert Taylor, 1755, attached to the chancel of the parish church, was demolished in 1862 (Colvin 1995, s.v. "Taylor, Sir Robert").</ref> Capability Brown made further recommendations for change, some of which were implemented.

Chilham Castle was purchased by James Wildman in 1794 and in 1816 was inherited by his son James Beckford Wildman, who sold it in 1861, because of falling income after emancipation of the slaves on the family estates in the West Indies. Plans of Chilham showing some of the substantial changes made to the building by David Brandon for Charles Hardy in 1862 and by Sir Herbert Baker for mining magnate Sir Edmund and Lady Davis in the early nineteen twenties are conserved in the Victoria & Albert Museum.

The present terracing, altered in the eighteenth and twentieth centuries, leads down to a fishing lake dating from the time of Charles Hardy's son Charles Stewart Hardy in the 1860s and 70s. The walls to the grounds date mostly from the eighteenth century, although the two gatehouses were only added in the early 1920s, again replacing a very different 19th-century one.

In the 1920s, The Keep was the country residence of the well-known British painters and art collectors, Charles Ricketts and Charles Haslewood Shannon.

From 1949 until his death in 1992 it was owned by the John Whyte-Melville-Skeffington, 13th Viscount Massereene Chilham Castle was owned by UKIP activist Stuart Wheeler, who lived there with his three daughters, Sarah, Jacquetta, and Charlotte until his death on 23 July 2020.  Stuart's wife the photographer Tessa Codrington died in 2016.

The site now hosts the Chilham Park Equestrian Centre.

In 1965 it was used for part of the filming of The Amorous Adventures of Moll Flanders starring Kim Novak, Leo McKern and Angela Lansbury. In 1985 Chilham Castle featured in an episode of 1980s police drama Dempsey & Makepeace as Makepeace's family home (filmed summer 1984). The episode was titled 'Cry God For Harry' and most of the hour-long episode was filmed in the castle and its grounds.  It also featured in the first episode in 1989 of the ITV adventure game show Interceptor produced by Chatsworth Television who were responsible for the earlier Treasure Hunt'' series. A medieval joust was being held there and a contestant was required to take part in order to progress further in the show.

In 1994, the castle featured in an episode of Agatha Christie's Poirot (ITV), as Simeon Lee's manor house Gorston Hall. It was also used in the 2006 TV film, "The Moving Finger" (Miss Marple) as the magnificent home of Cardew Pye. The entire village also features.

On April 13, 2021, the castle was put up for sale for £15 million.

See also
Castles in Great Britain and Ireland
List of castles in England

References

External links

Chilham Park Equestrian Centre
The Paul Bowles I Knew by Tessa Codrington
()

Castles in Kent
History of Kent
Grade I listed houses in Kent
Gardens by Capability Brown